Sacile is a town and comune in the province of Pordenone, in the Friuli Venezia Giulia region of northeastern Italy. It is known as the "Garden of the Serenissima" after the many palaces that were constructed along the river Livenza for the nobility of the Most Serene Republic of Venice.

Geography
The historic center is located on two islands of the river Livenza; it is unclear whether the islands are natural or manmade.

History
Sacile developed in the seventh century as a strong-point on the route from Veneto to Friuli. A cathedral and a castle were built on the larger island, while the smaller had the port and commercial area.

The town became part of the  Patriarchal State of Friuli on its creation in 1077; in 1190 the Patriarch conferred on it city rights. Sacile was the first city in Friuli to have a Communal Statute. The city was besieged on a number of occasions by troops of Venezia and Treviso.

In 1420 Sacile, along with the rest of Friuli, was annexed by the Republic of Venice. Under Venetian rule the river trade expanded and many noble families built palaces on the banks of the Livenza.

The fall of the Republic in 1797 caused an economic crisis in Sacile. On 16 April 1809 French troops were defeated by the Austrians in the Battle of Sacile which took place in the nearby hamlet of Camolli. In 1815, under the terms of the Congress of Vienna, Sacile became part of the Kingdom of Lombardy–Venetia.

The coming of the railway in 1855 did much to restore the economic position of Sacile. In 1866 Sacile was annexed by the Kingdom of Italy and saw the beginnings of industrial activity.

During the First and Second World Wars the town was repeatedly bombarded on account of the strategic importance of the Venice–Udine railway. The earthquake of 18 October 1936 caused great damage to the town's buildings and to its ancient city walls.

Economy

Brickmaking occurred in Sacile from the 14th century until 1957. Today, the main economic activity there is administration and services, although it is also home to piano manufacturer Fazioli.

Dialect
The native dialect of the town is Sacilese, a colonial variety of the Venetan language belonging to the Liventine (Northeastern) group.

Twin towns
Sacile is twinned with:

  La Réole, France, since 2000
  Giffoni Valle Piana, Italy, since 2011
  Novigrad, Croatia, since 2015

People
Massimo Borgobello
Ferruccio Furlanetto
Enrico Gasparotto
Luigi Gasparotto
Giovanni Micheletto
Giuseppe Antonio Pujati
Fausto Rossi

Transport
Sacile railway station is on the busy Venice–Udine railway. Train services operate to Venice, Treviso, Udine and Trieste, Padua, Verona, Milan, Bologna and Rome. Buses operate to Pinzano.

References

Cities and towns in Friuli-Venezia Giulia